MNCTV (legally PT MNC Televisi Indonesia, formerly named TPI) is an Indonesian private television network. It was founded on 23 January 1990, at first broadcasting only educational programmes, but has since become similar to other Indonesian TV networks, showing programmes such as quizzes, sinetron (soap operas), reality TV shows, sports shows, and recently, dangdut music.

History

Acronyms of TPI

Early days

TPI (Televisi Pendidikan Indonesia, Indonesian Educational Television) was first founded as an educational television network by Tutut Soeharto, the first daughter of former president Soeharto and the wife of Bimantara Citra's co-founder and RCTI's then-commissioner Indra Rukmana on 23 January 1990 via her company PT Cipta Lamtoro Gung Persada. It began its first broadcasts as trial broadcast on 26 December 1990 and later officially launched on 23 January 1991, timeshared with then state broadcaster TVRI. TPI also used TVRI's Studio 12 as its operational studio.

When it was founded TPI produced a two-hour educational programming block targeted to elementary students, middle school students, and high school students, from 08:00 to 10:00 WIB. To do so, it cooperated with the Department of Education and Culture (now Ministry of Education, Culture, Research, and Technology). Programming time began at 6:00am with the country's first breakfast TV show produced by the channel, with the rest of the day dedicated to cartoons and other child-friendly programming, signing off early afternoon.

In April 1991, the block was expanded into 4 hours, from 08:00 to 12:00 WIB; later to 6.5 hours, from 06:30 to 12:00 WIB; and in 1992 TPI was already broadcasting eight hours in a day, from 06:00 to 14:00 WIB, with several hours being a joint simulcast with TVRI for its educational programming. On January 23, 1993, TPI began to air its first soap opera program as a distraction, while it expanded broadcasting hours to 15.5 hours, from 05:30 to 21:00. By then it gained its own frequency - TPI UHF Channel 34, later on moved to Channel 37.

1993–2003: Splitting service
In 1995, TPI moved to Gate II Taman Mini Indonesia Indah in East Jakarta, with the opening of new studios as part of the celebrations of 50 years of nationhood.

On 23 January 1993, TPI began to air its first reality TV show. Three years later, TPI launched its own news programming. After TPI ended its ties with TVRI on 1 October 1998, TPI split becoming its own dedicated channel and its educational programs were displaced by more soap operas and entertainment programming, while it began to air to more Indonesian provinces. In late 1997, the channel retired the original branding name in favour of the on-air name "Televisi Keluarga Indonesia" ("The Indonesian Family Channel") which introduced in 1996. Its logo bore a resemblance to that of the Family Channel (now Freeform in US and Challenge in UK). On 18 May 2001, the TPI name was used but only using the simple word "TPI" instead. TPI began to expand more programs that related to musics, sports, and cartoons.

Since 2004, it has focused on dangdut programs. The most successful dangdut contest, Kontes Dangdut TPI (KDI, later Kontes Dangdut Indonesia), is a version of RCTI's Indonesian Idol.

On 12 February 2002, TPI announced that it would broadcast Formula One racing (known as TPI Sport and Racing World) to replace RCTI as the official F1 station, due to financial problems.

On 2002−03, TPI announced that it would broadcast for the Italian football league Serie A.

2003–2009: Awards and acquisition by MNC

At the 1997 Indonesian Soap-Opera Awards, Deddy Mizwar's soap opera Mat Angin, aired by TPI, won 11 awards. The series won five awards the following year. Indonesia's favourite programme was Santapan Nusantara a culinary program hosted by Enita Sriyana, Nindy Ellesse (Alm), and Ida Kusumah (Alm). Kuis Dangdut (hosted by H. Jaja Miharja), the first and oldest quiz show, also won awards and Ngelaba a comedy program hosted by Akri Patrio, Eko Patrio and Parto Patrio.

In October 2003, Media Nusantara Citra, which also owns RCTI, GTV, and iNews acquired 75% of the channel. In 2005, new employees were hired, including Mayjen. TNI. (purn.) Sang Nyoman Suwisma, and Dandy Nugroho Rukmana.

2009–2010: Decline

During its 2009–10 season, due to technical reasons, TPI did not air its sport shows. On 20 October 2009, a controversial report stated that a communications expert from the University of Indonesia, Ade Armando, had reviewed decisions of the judges who were willing to pull entertainment programs from TPI, since it should have educational programs instead. Armando said that it must be the decision of the Commercial Court (PN) to grant the request of the Central Jakarta bankruptcy PT Global Crown Capital Limited on PT TPI reviewed further.

The handling of cases involving the mass media can not be equated with the handling of other service companies. Because, not all people are able and capable of using it, so that the handling had to be excluded. "It looks very sloppy, not equal," he said. In this bankruptcy decision, according to Ade, a loss not only experienced by the company but also harmed the public.

Anticipating similar things, there must be a joint effort of several parties, such as the Indonesian Broadcasting Commission (KPI), the Association of Private Television, and other stakeholders. Especially against the decision issued unilaterally and awkward legal institutions.

Decisions of bankruptcy have also been supported by the Parliament in the legal process underway at the level of the Indonesian Supreme Court. Support was expressed Marzuki Alie when receiving the visit of Directors of TPI in the study of the DPR, Senayan, Jakarta, on 25 November 2009.

2010–present: Re-launch to MNCTV

On 20 October 2010, TPI officially renamed to MNCTV. This was done because TPI was not in accordance with the written context that TPI is dedicated to education and therefore renamed to MNCTV, in order to change the image in the eyes of the public.

Notable main directors
 Siti Hardiyanti Rukmana (1990–1998)
 Tito Sulistio (1998-2001)
 Dandy Nugroho Rukmana (2001–2003)
 Hidajat Tjandradjaja (2003–2005)
 Sang Nyoman Suwisma (2005–present)

See also
 List of television stations in Indonesia
 MNC Trijaya FM

References

External links
 

Television networks in Indonesia
Television channels and stations established in 1990
1990 establishments in Indonesia
Mass media in Jakarta
Media Nusantara Citra